The 2003 GMAC Bowl was an American college football bowl game. It was part of the 2003 NCAA Division I-A football season. The game featured the Louisville Cardinals, and the Miami RedHawks.

Game summary
Miami started the scoring with quarterback Ben Roethlisberger throwing a 28-yard touchdown pass to wide receiver Michael Larkin to post an early 7–0 lead. Later in the quarter, running back Cal Murray scored on a two-yard touchdown run to give the Redhawks a 14–0 lead. Ben Roethlisberger threw a 12-yard touchdown pass to wide receiver Martin Nance to give Miami a 21–0 first quarter lead.

Early in the second quarter, Lionel Gates scored a rushing touchdown for Louisville to make it 21–7. Ben Roethlisberger threw a 16-yard touchdown pass to Matt Brandt, and the lead was 28–7. Roethlisberger threw another touchdown pass to Michael Larkin, to give Miami a 35–7 lead. Louisville running back Michael Bush threw a 31-yard touchdown pass to wide receiver JR Russell to make it 35–14. Before halftime, quarterback Stefan LeFors threw a 2-yard touchdown pass to Russell, and the halftime score was Miami 35, Louisville 21.

Stefan Lefors threw a 24-yard touchdown pass to Russell in the third quarter, to make the score 35–28 Miami, but Louisville would get no closer. Mike Smith scored on a 3-yard touchdown run, and Matt Pusateri returned an interception 35 yards for a touchdown to make the final score 49–28.

Statistics

References

External links
 USA Today summary
 ESPN summary

Gmac Bowl
LendingTree Bowl
Louisville Cardinals football bowl games
Miami RedHawks football bowl games
GMAC